Saidpura or Saidpur is a census town in the Indian state of Bihar. It is a part of Patna urban agglomeration.

Demographics
 India census, Saidpura had a population of 7,392 of which 3,900 are males while 3,492 are females. 14.92% of the population was under six years of age. The sex ratio of 918 per 1,000 males was lower than the national average of 944. The data on religion in 2011 showed Hinduism as the majority religion with 98.88% followers. The overall literacy rate is 75.47%, with the male literacy rate being 82.29% and the female literacy rate being 67.81%.

References

Cities and towns in Patna district
Neighbourhoods in Patna